The Austria men's national under-18 ice hockey team is the men's national under-18 ice hockey team of Austria. The team is controlled by the Austrian Ice Hockey Association, a member of the International Ice Hockey Federation. The team represents Austria at the IIHF World U18 Championships.

International competitions

IIHF World U18 Championships

1999: 2nd in Pool B
2000: 2nd in Pool B
2001: 2nd in Division I
2002: 3rd in Division I
2003: 5th in Division I Group B
2004: 3rd in Division I Group A
2005: 5th in Division I Group A

2006: 5th in Division I Group A
2007: 5th in Division I Group A
2008: 3rd in Division I Group B
2009: 3rd in Division I Group B
2010: 6th in Division I Group A
2011: 1st in Division II Group A
2012: 3rd in Division I Group B

External links
Austria at IIHF.com

I
National under-18 ice hockey teams